The Coronation Chair is the throne used by British monarchs during their coronation. 

Other thrones which may be referred to as coronation chairs include:

 Chair of St Augustine, used at the enthronement of the Archbishop of Canterbury
 Chair of Saint Peter, the traditional throne of the Pope
 Coronation Chair of Denmark
 Silver Throne, used at the coronations of Swedish moanarchs